Stanley Ebden Horwood (22 July 1877 – 15 August 1959) was a Cape Colony cricketer who played first class cricket from 1899 to 1909.

Born in Port Elizabeth, Horwood was a middle-order batsman for Western Province. Despite a mediocre Currie Cup season in 1903–04, when he scored 65 runs at an average of 13.00, he was selected to tour England in 1904 with the South African team. He was not successful there either, scoring 103 runs at 10.30 in nine first-class matches. His best match was for Western Province against the touring MCC in 1905–06, when he scored 23 and 74.

He married Anna Faure in 1914. They had a daughter and two sons. Their son Owen became a professor of economics and a politician.

References

External links
 
 

1877 births
1959 deaths
Western Province cricketers
Cricketers from Cape Colony
Cricketers from Port Elizabeth